The Centre for European Policy Studies (CEPS) is a think tank based in Brussels, Belgium that undertakes research "leading to solutions to the challenges facing Europe today". It was established in 1983.

Organisation
CEPS is a leading think tank and forum for debate on EU affairs with an exceptional in-house research capacity and extensive network of partner institutes. It provides an independent platform for exchange and offer potential solutions for EU policymaking through research projects and publications, task forces and regular events and workshops. At CEPS, researchers provide expert insights and policy analysis across a vast array of policy areas: from economy and finance to better regulation, the digital economy and trade, energy and climate issues, to foreign policy, amongst others.

The think tank receives its funding from a variety of sources, including corporate and institutional membership fees, research projects, foundation grants and conference fees. 

It was established in 1983 as the first think tank dealing primarily with the issues related to the European integration. Its first director was Peter Ludlow. Currently,   CEPS' CEO is Karel Lannoo. 

CEPS board
Joaquín Almunia, Chairman, former Vice-President of the European Commission
Dora Bakoyannis, Member of the Hellenic Parliament, Former Minister of Foreign Affairs of Greece
Ferdinando Beccalli-Falco, President and CEO, Falco Enterprises AG
John Bruton, Chairman of IFSC Ireland and former Prime Minister of Ireland
Viscount Étienne Davignon, Vice-Chairman, Suez-Tractebel, Minister of State, Belgium
Jaap de Hoop Scheffer, former Secretary General of NATO and University of Leiden
Elisabeth Guigou, Administrateure civile, Femme politique Europartenaires, Fondation Anna Lindh
Prof. Danuta Maria Hübner, Member of the European Parliament, former Chair of the Constitutional Affairs Committee
Caio Koch-Weser, Chair, Advisory Council of the European Climate Foundation, former German Deputy Minister of Finance and former Managing Director, World Bank
Cecilia Malmström, Former European Commissioner for Trade and Senior Advisor at Covington
Stefano Micossi, Director General, Assonime
Marija Pejčinović Burić, Secretary General, Council of Europe, former Deputy Prime Minister and Minister of Foreign and European Affairs of the Republic of Croatia
H. Onno Ruding, Former Minister of Finance of the Netherlands and retired Vice-Chairman, Citigroup
Daniel Gros, Distinguished Fellow, CEPS

CEPS senior research staff
Karel Lannoo, CEO
Daniel Gros, Distinguished Fellow
Cinzia Alcidi, Director of Research
Steven Blockmans, Director of Research
Sergio Carrera, Senior Research Fellow
Christian Egenhofer, Associate Senior Research Fellow
Willem Pieter De Groen, Senior Research Fellow
Jorge Núñez Ferrer, Senior Research Fellow
Lorenzo Pupillo, Associate Senior Research Fellow
Andrea Renda, Senior Research Fellow
Vasileios Rizos, Head of Unit
Michael Emerson, Associate Senior Research Fellow
Andreas Kopp, Senior Research Fellow

Areas of expertise 
CEPS has research programmes on:
Finance 
Economic and monetary affairs
Foreign and security policy
EU institutions and policy making
Migration, asylum and borders
AI, digitalisation and innovation
Human rights and justice
Energy, climate change and the environment
Employment, social affairs and inclusion
Trade

Research networks
CEPS is also involved in a number of research networks, namely:
EU Independent Fiscal Institutions (EUIFI)
European Capital Markets Institute (ECMI)
European Credit Research Institute (ECRI)

References

External links
Centre for European Policy Studies homepage

CEPS
1983 establishments in Belgium
Think tanks established in 1983
Political and economic think tanks based in the European Union
Politics of the European Union
Think tanks based in Belgium